Zob Ahan Ardabil Football Club is an Iranian football club based in Ardabil, Iran. They competed in the Ardabil Provincial League.

Season-by-Season

The table below shows the achievements of the club in various competitions.

See also
 Hazfi Cup
 Iran Football's 2nd Division 2009–10

Football clubs in Iran
Association football clubs established in 2003
2003 establishments in Iran